South Eastern Tasmania Eightball Association  is the governing body for the South Eastern Tasmania, Australia or the "Eastern Shore" of Hobart for the sport of Eightball pool, a cue sport and is affiliated with Eightball Tasmania.

Members
Beltana Hotel, Lindsifarne
Dodges Ferry Cafe
Eastern Suburbs Rugby Union Football Club Inc., North Warrane
Horse Shoe Inn, Cambridge
Midway Point Tavern
Pembroke Hotel, Sorell
Richmond Hotel
Shoreline Hotel, Howrah
Sorell RSL

Former members
Campania Hotel - Hotel no longer exists through Fire
Clarence Hotel, Bellerive
Foreshore Tavern, Lauderdale
Gordon Highlander, Sorell
LewishamTavern
Pines Resort, Seven Mile Beach
Sun Valley Inn, Mornington
Village Green Tavern, Rokeby
Willows Tavern, Risdon - Hotel Demolished 2015

Notable Representative Title
World Titles
2015 World Junior Team World Champions - Australia - Alexander Pace(ESRUFC)

Runner Up
2010 World Junior Singles Final - Anthony Adams

Australian Team Representation
2015 Australian Team Captain - Jeremy McGuire(Midway Point Tavern)
2015 Australian Junior Team Vice Captain - Alexander Pace(ESRUFC)
2015 Australian Junior Team Representative - Alexander Pace(ESRUFC)
2010 Australian Junior Team Captain - Anthony Adams (Belatana)
2008 Australian Junior Team Representative - Anthony Adams (Beltana)
2009 Australian Junior Team Representative - Anthony Adams (Belatana)
2010 Australian Junior Team Representative - Anthony Adams (Belatana), Chris Forsyth (Foreshore)

Australian Titles
2017 Australian Masters Champion - Greg Lawry (Midway Point Tavern)
2011 Australian Junior Team Champions - Tasmania - Manager Cyrill Triffett (Beltana)
2010 Australian Under 18 Singles Champion - Anthony Adams(Beltana/Tasmania)
Australian Junior Team Champions - Tasmania - Manager Cyrill Triffett(Beltana), Anthony Adams(Beltana), Alexander Pace(ESRUFC)

Tasmanian Titles
Singles Title
2015 Tasmanian State Singles Title - Jeremy McGuire(Midway Point Tavern)
2015 R/U Tasmanian State Singles Title - Alexander Pace(ESRUFC)
2013 Tasmanian State Singles Title - Anthony Adams (Beltana)
2011 Tasmanian State Singles Title - Anthony Adams (Beltana)
1999 Tasmanian State Singles Title - Jeremy McGuire
1994 Tasmanian State Singles Title - Justin Van Diepen
1991 Tasmanian State Singles Title -Geoff Youd

Masters Singles Title
2008 Tasmanian State Masters Singles Title -Geoff Youd

Open Doubles Title
2012 Tasmanian State Open Doubles Title - Dallas Nichols / Justin Van Diepen
2003 Tasmanian State Open Doubles Title - Dallas Nichols / Justin Van Diepen
2002 Tasmanian State Open Doubles Title - Dallas Nichols / Justin Van Diepen

State Teams Event
2013 Beltana GTR's
2011 Foreshore Tavern Breakers
2002 Shoreline Hotel
1994 Foreshore Tavern Black
1992 Foreshore Tavern Black

Bill Johnston Memorial Shield A Grade Premiers

Ernie Doring Memorial Shield B Grade Premiers

See also

Cue sports in Australia

References

External links
http://www.wepf.org/menu.php?option=2/ World Eightball Pool Federation
https://web.archive.org/web/20150701012726/http://www.aebf.com.au/index.php/aebf/australian-eight-ball-federation-inc Australian Eight Ball Federation
http://eightballtasmania.com.au/ Eightball Tasmania
http://seteba.com.au/ South Eastern Tasmania Eightball Association

Venue External Links
http://www.beltanahotel.com.au/ Beltana Hotel
https://web.archive.org/web/20160107080524/http://easts.rugbynet.com.au/ Eastern Suburbs Rugby Union Football Club
http://midwaypointtavern.com.au/ Midway Point Tavern
http://www.pembrokehotel.com.au/ Pembroke Hotel
http://www.richmondarmshotel.com.au/ Richmond Arms Hotel
http://www.shorelinehotel.com.au/ Shoreline Hotel

Eightball pool governing bodies in Tasmania